Hossein Nouri (born 4 August 1990) is a professional Iranian wrestler of the Iranian national team. He has won the bronze medal of the World Championships, the gold medal of the Asian Games in 2018 and also 3 championship titles in the Asian Championships.

Career 
In 2010 he won the silver  Known as Hossein Nouri He won the gold medal at the 2018 Asian Wrestling Championships He won the bronze medalist at the 2017 World Wrestling Championships  He won the gold medal at the 2017 Asian Wrestling Championship   He won the gold medal at the 2019 Asian Wrestling Championship He won the gold medal at the Wrestling at the 2018 Asian Games – Men's Greco-Roman 87 kg.He won gold medal 2016 Wrestling World Cup - Men's Creco-Roman 

He won bronze medal 2017 Wrestling World Cup - Men's Greco-Roman.

World Championship 2017 
Nouri was able to obtain a license to participate in the 2017 World Wrestling Championship by beating his rivals in the selection tests of the Iranian team. He won the first World Cup 7-5 against Ividas Stankovicius of Lithuania, and then finished third in Estonia with a score of 3-1 at Eric Ops, fifth in Europe, to reach the quarter-finals. At this stage, Nouri competed against Victor Lawrence, the 2014 world bronze medalist, the 2017 European champion and the fifth person of the Rio 2016 Olympics from Hungary, and won 6-4 and reached the semifinals. Nouri lost to Denis Kodella of Germany 4-1 in the semifinals. Nouri lost to Denis Kodella of Germany 4-1 in the semifinals and went on to compete against Islam Abbasov of Azerbaijan for a bronze medal in the qualifying match, winning the medal 4-0.

2018 Asian Games 
At the 2018 Asian Games in Incheon, Nouri defeated Turkmenistan's Shihaz Avilikov 3-4 and Yemen's Mohammad Al-Quhali 8-0 to compete for the gold medal, with Rustam Asakalov of Uzbekistan competing for the gold medal. Defeated 6–1 to win the Asian Games.

2019 Asian Championship 
Nouri competed in the 87 kg category on April 27, 2019 as part of the Asian Championships. In defending the title, he first defeated Phi Peng of China 3-1, and then defeated Matsu III of Japan 4-2 in the second leg to advance to the semifinals. Nouri defeated Uzbekistan's Rostam Asakalov 3-0 in a close match to win the gold medal for the third year in a row, defeating India's Sunil Kumar 2-0 in the final.

Honours

National 

 World Championship
  Bronze : 2017, Greco-Roman 85 kg
 Asian Gemes 
   Gold: 2018, Greco-Roman 87 kg
 Asian Championship  Gold:2017, delhi 
 Asian Championship  Gold: 2018,Biskhek
 Asian Championship  Gold:  2019, Xian
World Cup  Gold: 2016 Shiraz 
World Cup Bronze : 2017 Abadan

References

 مدال برنز حسین نوری در کشتی فرنگی قهرمانی جهان medal1.com (in Persian).
 حسین نوری به مدال طلا بوسه زد/ ۵ طلای کشتی ایران در بازی‌های آسیایی isna.ir (in Persian).
 ثبت دومین طلای کشتی فرنگی به نام حسین نوری yjc.ir (in Persian).
 تلاش همه جانبه برای درمان حسین نوری mehrnews.com 14 November 2020 (in Persian).
 کشتی فرنگی قهرمانی آسیا حسین نوری موفق به کسب مدال طلا شد tarafdari.com (in Persian).
 حسین نوری چهارمین طلایی ایران/ ایران با ۴ طلا،یک نقره و۲ برنز قهرمان آسیا شد saat24.news (in Persian).
 حسین نوری به بخش منتقل شد tasnimnews.com (in Persian).
 حسین نوری قهرمان وزن 85 کیلو گرم شد varzesh3.com (in Persian).
 Greco-Roman wrestler Hossein Nouri hospitalized in ICU with COVID-19 tehrantimes.com (in Persian).
 Hossein Nouri en.iawf.ir (in Persian).
حسین نوری: هر کسی لایق باشد به مسابقات جهانی می‌رود و بهترین مدال را می‌گیرد pana.ir (in Persian).
قهرمانی حسین نوری در فینال 87 کیلوگرم  کشتی فرنگی+فیلم mezanonline.com (in Persian).
فیلم مدال بزنر حسین نوری در کشتی فرنگی قهرمان جهان mashereghnews.ir (in Persian).
مسابقات کشتی فرنگی قهرمانی آسیا 2019 - شی‌آن (چین)  وزن 87 کیلوگرم  video.varzesh3.com  (in Persian).
قهرمانی کشتی بزرگسالان 2019 آسیا- تیم کشتی فرنگی ایران راهی چین شد iwn.ir (in Persian).
تیم ملی کشتی فرنگی به پاریس رفت iribnews.ir (in Persian). 19 August 2017
هت‌تریک برنزی شاگردان اشکانی با برتری «نوری» در رده‌بندی  varzesh.com (in Persian). 2 Desamber 2018
کرونا فرنگی کار تیم ملی را راهی ICU کرد/ حال حسین نوری وخیم است isna.ir (in Persian).
پایان تلاش شاگردان بنا با 2طلا و 2برنز در روز نخست mehrnews.com (in Persian). 27 April 2019
Hossein Nouri TheSports.org (in Persian).  4 August 1990
Wrestler Nouri discharged from hospital after beating COVID19 mehrnews.com  (in Persian). Jul 13 2020

External links 
 Hossein Nouri on Instagram
 Hossein Nouri at the International Olympic Committee
 Hossein Nouri at United World Wrestling

Living people
1990 births
Iranian male sport wrestlers
World Wrestling Championships medalists
Wrestlers at the 2018 Asian Games
Medalists at the 2018 Asian Games
Asian Games medalists in wrestling
Asian Games gold medalists for Iran
People from Zanjan, Iran